Ricky Tasker (born October 15, 1976 in Forfar, Scotland) is a Scottish-Australian curler.

At the international level, he is a  curler.

Teams and events

References

External links

Living people
1976 births
People from Forfar
Australian male curlers
Scottish male curlers
Pacific-Asian curling champions
Scottish emigrants to Australia